Mavis Elizabeth Nicholson Leno (born September 5, 1946) is an American philanthropist and wife of Jay Leno, the former host of The Tonight Show.

A leading feminist in California, in the United States as a whole, and internationally, Leno keeps a low profile in comparison to her husband, choosing instead to work behind the scenes of the non-profit, politically charged groups she supports and runs.

Leno has been the chair of the Feminist Majority Foundation's Campaign to Stop Gender Apartheid in Afghanistan since 1997. In 1999, Leno and her husband donated $100,000 to the organization, to further the cause of educating the public about the plight of Afghan women under the Taliban. The organization successfully protested the construction of an oil pipeline through Afghanistan, which could potentially have brought in billions of dollars to the Taliban. According to Melissa Rossi, Leno was a driving force in changing the opinion of U.S. President Bill Clinton and the executives of the now defunct oil company Unocal Corporation concerning the Taliban, after Leno had shed light on the group's treatment of women.

References

1946 births
Living people
American feminists
American philanthropists
Jay Leno
People from San Francisco